Athanasia quinquedentata, or the fivetooth kanniedood, is a species of plant from South Africa.

Description 

The leaves range from round to oblong in shape and are alternately arranged. The margins have 3-5 convex teeth, although they can also rarely have straight edges. The flowers are yellow with 10-40 florets that grow from a ringed base. The discoid flower heads are mostly borne in terminal corymbs with a ringed base of dense stalked glands. They are present between October and January.

Distribution and habitat 
This species is endemic to South Africa. It grows between Stanford and Gqeberha where it grows on limestone and sandstone hills. 

There are two subspecies based on the distribution of this species:

 Athanasia quinquedentata subsp. rigens Källersjö: This subspecies is known from a limestone ridge that runs parallel to Stilbaai in the Western Cape of South Africa. It prefers the alkaline sands of coastal lowland regions, but it may also be found on the ecotones between acidic and alkaline regions.
 Athanasia quinquedentata subsp. quinquedentata is the more widespread of the two subspecies. It is known from the Eastern Cape of South Africa.

Conservation 
While Athanasia quinquedentata subsp. quinquedentata is considered to be of least concern by the South African National Biodiversity Institue, Athanasia quinquedentata subsp. rigens is classified as vulnerable. It has a limited range, and it is losing its habitat to invasive acacias.

References 

Flora of South Africa
Plants described in 1800
Anthemideae